John Strohm (or John P. Strohm, born March 23, 1967 in Bloomington, Indiana) is an American musician, singer, and lawyer.  He began his musical career playing drum set in Indiana's punk rock scene, then moved to Boston in 1985 and switched to guitar.   With Juliana Hatfield and Freda Love (then Freda Boner) he co-founded the indie rock trio Blake Babies in 1986.  In 1994 the band Velo-Deluxe with Strohm as the frontman released their only album Superelastic through Mammoth Records. Strohm also played drums in The Lemonheads from 1987 - 1989 and guitar during the years 1993-1994 and 1996-1997.    He led the indie rock band Antenna and released his first solo album, Vestavia, in 1999.   In 2007 Strohm released another full-length album, Everyday Life.

From 2011 to 2017, Strohm worked for the Nashville law firm Loeb & Loeb LLP as senior counsel in their music industry practice. In late 2017, he was named President of Rounder Records.

References

External links
 John P. Strohm discography on idiot-dog.com
 John P. Strohm Myspace Page

1967 births
Living people
Musicians from Bloomington, Indiana
Alabama lawyers
American rock guitarists
American male guitarists
American indie rock musicians
University of Alabama at Birmingham alumni
Samford University alumni
The Lemonheads members
Guitarists from Indiana
20th-century American guitarists
20th-century American male musicians